A list of regulators in India.

Regulatory agencies exercise regulatory or supervisory authority over a variety of activities and endeavors in India.

List

1. RBI – Reserve Bank of India 

Sector: Banking & Finance, Monetary Policy

Start function on 1 April 1935

NATIONALISATION : 1 January 1949

CURRENT HEAD : Shaktikant Das

2. SEBI – Securities and Exchange Board of India 
Sector: Securities (Stock) & Capital Market 
Year of Establishment 1992

3. IRDAI – Insurance Regulatory and Development Authority of India 
Sector: Insurance

Year of establishment -1999.

4. PFRDA – Pension Fund Regulatory & Development Authority 
Sector: Pension

5. NABARD – National Bank for Agriculture and Rural Development 
Sector: Financing of rural development

6. SIDBI – Small Industries Development Bank of India 
Sector: Financing Micro, Small and Medium-Scale Enterprises

7. NHB - National Housing Bank 
Sector: Financing Housing

8. TRAI – Telecom Regulatory Authority of India 
Sector: Telecommunication & Tariffs and Cyber-Security

9. CBFC – Central Board of Film Certification 
Sector: Film/TV Certification & Censorship

10. FSDC – Financial Stability and Development Council 
Sector: Financial Sector Development of Indian

11. FSSAI – Food Safety and Standards Authority of India 
Sector: Food

12. BIS – Bureau of Indian Standards 
Sector: Standards & Certification

13. ASCI – Advertising Standards Council of India 
Sector: Advertising

14. BCCI – Board of Control for Cricket in India 
Sector: Cricket

15. AMFI – Association of Mutual Funds in India 
Sector: Mutual Funds

16. EEPC – Engineering Export Promotional Council of India 
Sector: Trade and Investment

17. EICI – Express Industry Council of India 
Sector: Trade

18. FIEO – Federation of Indian Export Organisation 
Sector: Export

19. INSA – Indian National Shipowners’ Association 
Sector: Shipping

20. ICC – Indian Chemical Council 
Sector: Manufacturing

21. ISSDA – Indian Stainless Steel Development Association 
Sector: Growth and Development

22. MAIT – Manufacturers’ Association for Information Technology 
Sector: IT

23. NASSCOM – National Association of Software and Service Companies 
Sector: Information Technology

24. OPPI – Organisation Of Plastic Processors of India 
Sector: Manufacturing

25. PEPC – Project Exports Promotion Council of India 
Sector: Trade

26. CDSCO – Central Drugs Standard Control Organisation 
Sector: Medical Devices and Drugs

27. IBBI - Insolvency and Bankruptcy Board of India

28. NATIONAL GREEN TRIBUNAL

29. AERB - Atomic Energy Regulatory Board 
Sector: Atomic Energy & Nuclear Power

Established: November 15, 1983

Current Chairman: G. Nageswara Rao

30. (EPFO)Employees' Provident Fund Organisation- Employees Provident Fund Organisation

See also

References

 
Regulators
India